Back Home, is an album by saxophonist Warne Marsh which was recorded in 1986 and released on the Dutch Criss Cross Jazz label.

Reception 

The Allmusic review states "the tenor master and Tristano disciple works through a set of tunes that, in true Tristano fashion, are built entirely upon the harmonic foundations of popular standards. ... Marsh's peculiar linear logic and behind-the-beat phrasing are the aural equivalent of well-aged scotch, and his rapport with Barry Harris represents a felicitous union of straight bebop and one of its most enigmatic tributaries, the Tristano school".

Track listing 
All compositions by Warne Marsh except where noted
 "Leave Me" (Lennie Tristano) – 5:16
 "See Me Now, If You Could" – 5:41
 "Two Not One" (Tristano) – 5:08
 "Big Leaps for Lester" – 4:57
 "Back Home" (Tristano) – 8:04
 "Heads Up" – 5:31
 "Good Bait" (Tadd Dameron, Count Basie) – 8:11
 "Rhythmically Speaking" – 4:31
 "Joy Spring" (Clifford Brown) – 7:26
 "Big Leaps for Lester" [alternate take] – 4:43 Bonus track on CD reissue
 "Good Bait" [alternate take] (Dameron, Basie) – 6:34 Bonus track on CD reissue
 "Back Home" [alternate take] (Tristano) – 4:48 Bonus track on CD reissue

Personnel 
Warne Marsh, Jimmy Halperin (tracks 1, 3, 5 & 12) – tenor saxophone
Barry Harris – piano
David Williams – bass
Albert Heath – drums

References 

Warne Marsh albums
1986 albums
Criss Cross Jazz albums
Albums recorded at Van Gelder Studio